The Old North Memorial Garden is a garden outside the Old North Church in Boston's North End neighborhood, in the U.S. state of Massachusetts.

Description and history
The garden was designed and built by a group of volunteers in 2005 to commemorate those killed in the Iraq and Afghanistan wars.

Two plaques for the garden's Iraq–Afghanistan Memorial were unveiled in 2018; one describes the dog tags representing American service members killed during the wars, and the other is a bronze poppy wreath commemorating British and Commonwealth service members who died.

Reception
The Los Angeles Times called the memorial "a good place to reflect on war — from America’s birth (the city's famed Paul Revere statue is nearby too) to its ongoing conflicts".

References

2005 establishments in Massachusetts
Afghanistan-Iraq War memorials
Bronze sculptures in Massachusetts
Gardens in Massachusetts
Monuments and memorials in Boston
North End, Boston
Outdoor sculptures in Boston